Plumbland is a village and civil parish in the Allerdale district in the county of Cumbria, England. Situated towards the north west corner of the county, it is two miles from the outskirts of the Lake District National Park which is considered to be an Area of Outstanding Natural Beauty. The parish includes the hamlets of Threapland, Parsonby and Arkleby.

Governance
Plumbland is part of the Workington constituency of the UK parliament. The current Member of Parliament is Mark Jenkinson, a member of the Conservative Party. 2019 marks only the second time since the Second World War that a Conservative has been elected for Workington, the first being at the 1976 by-election.

For Local Government purposes it is in the Aspatria Ward of Allerdale Borough Council and the Bothel and Wharrels Ward of Cumbria County Council.

The village also has its own Parish Council jointly with nearby Parsonby; Plumbland Parish Council Parish Council.

For the European Parliament residents in Plumbland voted to elect MEP's for the North West England constituency.

See also

Listed buildings in Plumbland

References

 Genuki

External links
 Cumbria County History Trust: Plumbland (nb: provisional research only – see Talk page)

 
Villages in Cumbria
Civil parishes in Cumbria
Allerdale